Strombosia ceylanica is a tree in the family Olacaceae. The specific epithet  is from the Latin meaning "of Ceylon".

Description
The bark is grey to brown. The flowers are greenish white. The wood is used in house construction.

Distribution and habitat
Strombosia ceylanica grows naturally in India's Kerala state, Sri Lanka, Peninsular Malaysia, Sumatra, Java and Borneo. Its habitat is forests from sea-level to  altitude.

References

Olacaceae
Flora of Kerala
Trees of Sri Lanka
Trees of Malesia
Plants described in 1846